Protobothrops xiangchengensis, commonly known as the Szechwan pit viper, Kham Plateau pitviper, or Sichuan lancehead, is a venomous pit viper species endemic to the Hengduan Mountains in south-central China. No subspecies are currently recognized.

Taxonomy
Originally described as a member of the genus Trimeresurus, it was later reassigned to Protobothrops.

Description
Scalation includes 25 (23, 24) rows of dorsal scales at midbody, 175–194/181–194 ventral scales in males/females, 54–66/44–62 subcaudal scales and 7–8 (9 or 10) supralabial scales.

Geographic range
Protobothrops xiangchengensis is endemic to the Hengduan Mountains in the provinces of Yunnan and western Sichuan, China. According to David & Tong (1997), the type locality given is "Sichuan Province, Xiangcheng, altitude 3100 m [10,200 ft]".

See also
Snakebite

References

Further reading
David, Patrick, and Haiyan Tong. 1997. Translations of Recent Descriptions of Chinese Pitvipers of the Trimeresurus-complex (Serpentes, Viperidae), with a Key to the Complex in China and Adjacent Areas. Smithsonian Herpetological Information Service (112): 1-31.
Zhao, Er-mi; Jiang, Yao-ming; & Huang, Qing-yun. 1979. Three new snake species in China. Materials Herpetological Research Chengden 4: 21.

xiangchengensis
Snakes of China
Endemic fauna of China
Reptiles described in 1978
Taxa named by Zhao Ermi